Cychrus bispinosus is a species of ground beetle in the subfamily of Carabinae that can be found in the following Chinese provinces: Gansu, Henan, Hubei, Shaanxi, and Sichuan. It was described by Deuve in 1989.

References

External links

bispinosus
Beetles described in 1989
Endemic fauna of China
Beetles of Asia